José "Pepe" Gonzáles Pimentel, Sr. (April 30, 1929 –  January 25, 2013) was a Filipino game show host, television personality, actor and singer. He rose to fame as the first champion of the original Tawag ng Tanghalan (1955). Pimentel later became known as the host of Kwarta o Kahon which ran for 38 years and was considered the precursor and inspiration of popular game segments such as Wowowee’s Pera o Bayong. 

After his show business career, Pimentel served as barangay captain in Barangay Laging Handa, Quezon City (1997–2007) and was described by neighbors as very helpful and friendly.

Pimentel died on January 25, 2013 in Barangay Laging Handa, Quezon City at the age of 83.

Filmography

Television

Film

References

1929 births
2013 deaths
Filipino game show hosts
Filipino people of Spanish descent
Filipino television variety show hosts
Male actors from Metro Manila
People from Quezon City
Politicians from Metro Manila
Radio Philippines Network personalities